Tony Marsico (born Nov.8th, 1957) is an American bassist/composer best known as co-founder of the rock and roll band the Cruzados formed in 1983. (two albums on Arista Records (1985,1987).
Prior to Cruzados, Marsico was a member of the Los Angeles punk band the Plugz (1980-1983) who were best known for scoring the motion picture “Repo Man).
Marsico has also recorded and toured with Bob Dylan, Neil Young, Marianne Faithfull, Roger Daltrey, Joe Ely, Willie Nelson, Linda Ronstadt, Dr. John, Susanna Hoffs, The Thorns, The DiVinyls, John Doe, Peter Case, Juliana Hatfield, Paul Jones, Rick Vito, Barry Goldberg among others. Marsico has co-written songs that appear in the motion picture Desperados.  In addition, Marsico was the bassist for indie pop singer Matthew Sweet for over 10 years. Marsico recorded the soundtrack to the Oscar winning film Session Man.

He has written four books “ I’m Just Here for the Gig”, “Late Nights with Bob Dylan,” Wild Things” and “King of Andalusia”. Marsico has produced two motion pictures Satan's Angel and Camp Burlesque.

Marsico leads his own Jazz band The Martini Kings and has released 25 albums, with music appearing in HBO'S Entourage and Six Feet Under. Marsico has acted in motion pictures which include Roadhouse, Georgia, Somebody to Love, LA Storyand Static''. In 2021 Marsico reformed his band “Cruzados” and released a new album titled “She’s Automatic”. Marsico has two children and lives in La Palma California.

References

American rock bass guitarists
American male bass guitarists
Living people
1957 births
Musicians from Philadelphia
20th-century American bass guitarists
The Plugz members
Cruzados members
Tito & Tarantula members
20th-century American male musicians